Nausta is a river in Sunnfjord Municipality in Vestland county, Norway. It runs through the Naustdal valley to the southwest before emptying into Førde Fjord at the village of Naustdal below Kletten Hill.

Salmon and sea trout fishing 

The Nausta is a small and medium-sized salmon river. From the old bridge across the Naustdalsfossen waterfall salmon may be observed climbing the falls. Fishing permits may be purchased at the local petrol station or from local landowners.

The stretch from the fjord to the Hovefoss waterfall is also good for sea trout fishing. The small Redal water system contains small salmon, sea trout, trout and char. Small salmon and sea trout are best caught during floods.

Fishing season
The salmon and sea trout season runs from 1 June until 31 August each year.

Catch statistics

The record for the largest fish caught in the river Nausta was set in 1946, when a salmon weighing  was caught.

See also
List of rivers in Norway

References

Rivers of Vestland
Sunnfjord
Rivers of Norway